Qianarreq is an uninhabited island of the Denmark Strait, Greenland. The island has an area of 108.1 km ² and has a shoreline of 65.9 kilometres.

References

Uninhabited islands of Greenland